Beauvallon is a hamlet in central Alberta, Canada within the County of Two Hills No. 21.

Beauvallon is a name derived from French meaning "beautiful vale".

Demographics 
Beauvallon recorded a population of 7 in the 1991 Census of Population conducted by Statistics Canada.

See also 
List of communities in Alberta
List of hamlets in Alberta

References 

Hamlets in Alberta
County of Two Hills No. 21